María Elena Swett Urquieta is a Chilean actress.

Early life 
She was born in Santiago on April 11, 1979. She studied at Colegio Nuestra Señora del Pilar and later at the Academia de Humanidades de Recoleta. Later, she studied theater at DUOC.

Acting career 
She debuted on television in 1999, in the series La otra cara del espejo on the Mega chain after being discovered by the director .

In 2002 he signed a contract with the dramatic area] of  Canal 13, a participant in five telenovelas produced by Verónica Saquel. In this period of popularity with his role in Machos and  Brujas , positioning herself alongside Jorge Zabaleta as the leading duo of the private channel. At the same time, he participated in the feature film , where he shared roles with the Argentine actor Fabián Mazzei.

In 2008 he signed an exclusive contract with the Dramatic Area of Televisión Nacional de Chile, starring in eight telenovelas, five of them being a duo with Zabaleta. In the state channel, she consolidated her television career, positioning herself as the main actress of the public channel in 2012. In 2018, after 10 years, the channel decided not to renew her contract. In 2016, according to the publication Primer plano, she was one of the actresses paid between 2011 and 2015 with better earnings calculated at $15 million pesos, only surpassed by Claudia Di Girolamo, Paz Bascuñán and Sigrid Alegría.

In 2019 she wrote a six-month contract with  Mega to star in  100 days to fall in love. 

In 2020, she premiered the previously recorded microseries  S.o.s mamis , in which she stars alongside Paz Bascuñán, Loreto Aravena, Tamara Acosta and Jenny Cavallo. She also, due to the COVID-19 pandemic, she began to do works online by Zoom for The Cow Company together with renowned Chilean actors. On December 1, 2020, she launches her first book S.o.s Mamis: el libro based on the microseries.

Personal life 
Formerly married to the Chilean actor Felipe Braun. She is also known as "Mane" by friends and family.

Filmography

Television

TV shows
 La Ruta de Asia (2009) - Host

References

External links
 
 Mane Swett Fans Club CHILE María Elena Swett Fans club

1979 births
Actresses from Santiago
Chilean film actresses
Chilean telenovela actresses
Chilean television actresses
Chilean television presenters
Chilean people of English descent
Chilean people of Basque descent
Living people
Chilean women television presenters
Chilean television personalities